"Mahutny Boža" (translated as "Almighty God") is a famous Belarusian hymn, based on a poem by Natallia Arsiennieva and music by Mikola Ravienski. It was translated into English by Vera Rich.

The hymn has given its name to a festival of ecclesiastical music in Mahilioŭ and became one of the protest songs during the 2020-21 Belarusian protests.

History 

In 1947 composer Mikola Ravienski wrote music for the poem "Prayer" written by Natallia Arsiennieva four years earlier. Soon it became widely used by Belarusian communities in the UK, US, Canada and Australia.

Since the late 1980s, the hymn has gained popularity in post-Soviet Belarus. In 1993 the Catholic Church in Belarus initiated a festival of ecclesiastical music in Mahilioŭ which was named after the hymn. 

In 1995 the hymn was proposed as one of the candidates for the national anthem of Belarus. However, the government of Alexander Lukashenka instead adopted the old anthem of Soviet Belarus with some variation to the lyrics.

In 2005 Mahutny Boža was translated into English by Vera Rich.

During the 2020-21 Belarusian protests the hymn became one of the protest songs and its performance was banned within the Belarusian parishes of the Russian Orthodox Church.

In spring 2021, the hymn was recognised as "one of the most popular Belarusian music pieces".

Lyrics

References

Further reading 

 Беларуская каталіцкая музыка. Касьцельныя песьні. Для зьмешанага хору [Belarusian Catholic music. Church hymns. For mixed choir] / Уклад. Уладзімер Неўдах. — Менск: Беларуская каталіцкая грамада, 1992 (in Belarusian)

External links 

 The hymn’s lyrics, Беларуская аўтакефальная праваслаўная царква [Belarusian Autocephalous Orthodox Church]
 Hymn Mahutny Boža in organ performance
Ilya Silchukou- Mighty God (Official Video)

Belarusian music
Belarusian songs
1947 songs